The Whitewater River is a small permanent stream in western Riverside County, California, with some upstream tributaries in southwestern San Bernardino County. The river's headwaters are in the San Bernardino Mountains, and it terminates at the Salton Sea in the Mojave Desert.  The area drained by the Whitewater River is part of the larger endorheic Salton Sea drainage basin.

Initially called Agua Blanco by early Spanish explorers, and later translated into English as white water, the river received its name for its milky appearance created by the silicate and lime sediments it carries.  The community of Whitewater was named after the river, and became a key stop on the Bradshaw Trail stagecoach runs.

Geography

San Bernardino Mountains
The Whitewater River has three significant tributaries: the North, Middle, and South Forks, all within the Sand to Snow National Monument.

The South Fork flows northeast through a narrower wooded canyon, joining the Middle Fork lower down. The upper watershed is in the San Gorgonio Wilderness and San Bernardino National Forest, then it reaches land managed by the Bureau of Land Management. Due to floods and shifting channels, there is almost no riparian forest development, except locally along unnamed minor tributaries with relatively stable channels.

The Pacific Crest Trail (PCT) enters the arroyo from the north and follows it downstream to a trailhead at the Whitewater Preserve, owned by The Wildlands Conservancy. A few fish have escaped upstream, establishing a small population of wild but non-native Rainbow Trout.  These fish are confined to places where there is shade or tributaries with cooler water.  They are not sufficiently adapted to elevated summer temperatures to colonize the rest of the stream.

Coachella Valley
Below the PCT trailhead, the enclosing hills fall away, so the arroyo exits from the San Bernardino Mountains near Morongo Valley into the western Coachella Valley. The San Gorgonio River rises further west on the south side of San Gorgonio Mountain and then joins it. Garnet Wash, Mission Creek, Chino Canyon Wash, Palm Canyon Wash, Cathedral Canyon, and Thousand Palm Canyon Wash also join, but the water mainly penetrates through the porous desert floor, providing groundwater recharging of the Coachella Valley aquifer.

Before approaching Palm Springs, the Whitewater River is fed imported water from the Colorado River Aqueduct, managed by the Metropolitan Water District of Southern California. During rare floods, surface water may reach the endorheic basin of the Salton Sea, below sea level.

Popular culture
In 2010 Huell Howser Productions, in association with KCET/Los Angeles, featured the river and nearby community in California's Gold.

References

Bibliography
 Gunther, Jane Davies (1984). Riverside County, California, Place Names; Their Origins and Their Stories, Riverside, CA. .

Citations and notes

External links
 Bureau of Land Management – Whitewater resources
 The Trust for Public Land: Whitewater
 
 Whitewater Canyon Earth and Biological Sciences

Rivers of Riverside County, California
Rivers of San Bernardino County, California
Coachella Valley
San Bernardino Mountains
Sand to Snow National Monument
Tributaries of the Salton Sea
Rivers of Southern California
Wild and Scenic Rivers of the United States